2C-TFE is a lesser-known psychedelic drug related to compounds such as 2C-E and 2C-TFM. It was first synthesised by Daniel Trachsel, and is reportedly a potent psychedelic with an active dose in the 5-15 mg range, and a long duration of action of 12-24 hours.

See also
 2C-EF
 3C-DFE
 Trifluoromescaline

References

2C (psychedelics)
Entheogens